Khomyakovo is a rural locality (a village) in Novlenskoye Rural Settlement, Vologodsky District, Vologda Oblast, Russia. The population was 18 as of 2002.

Geography 
Khomyakovo is located 79 km northwest of Vologda (the district's administrative centre) by road. Kurbatovo is the nearest rural locality.

References 

Rural localities in Vologodsky District